Blink of an Eye may refer to:

 Blinking, rapid movement of an eyelid
 Blink of an Eye (Enchant album), 2002
 Blink of an Eye (Ricochet album), 1997
 Blink of an Eye (Rob Brown and Matthew Shipp album), 1997
 Blink of an Eye (Michael McDonald album), 1993
 "Blink of an Eye" (Star Trek: Voyager), an episode of Star Trek: Voyager
 Blink of an Eye, a 1992 film directed by Bob Misiorowski
 Blink of an Eye (film), a 2019 documentary film directed by Paul Taublieb
 Blink of an Eye (novel) (originally Blink), a 2003 novel by Ted Dekker
 "Blink of an Eye" (Ricochet song), 1997
 "Blink of an Eye" (Tori Kelly song), 2016
 "Blink of an Eye", a song by Damageplan from New Found Power

See also 
 In the Blink of an Eye (disambiguation)